Rajaram III (31 July 1897 – 26 November 1940) of the Bhonsle dynasty, was Maharaja of Kolhapur from 1922–1940, succeeding his father Maharaja Shahu. A benevolent ruler, he was instrumental in the uplifting of the dalits and depressed castes in his state. He also established the Kolhapur High Court, modern housing developments, an updated water-supply system, free primary education and higher-level female education. As he only left a daughter "Princess Padmaraje Raghujiraje Kadambande of Fort Torkhed, Dist. Nandurbar at his death, he was succeeded by a distant relation, Shivaji VII. After Shahaji II, People of Kolhapur State wanted Grandchild of Shrimant Rajaram & Son of Princess Padmaraje Kadambande, Shrimant Rajwardhan Raghujiraje Kadambande to succeed the Throne of Kolhapur being the direct descendant of Rajarshi Shahu & Rajaram. Lakhs of people agitated for the same.

Titles
1897-1922: Shrimant Yuvaraja Rajaram III Chhatrapati Maharaj Bhonsle
1922-1924: His Highness Kshatriya-Kulawatasana Sinhasanadhishwar, Shrimant Rajashri Rajaram III Chhatrapati Maharaj Sahib Bahadur, Maharaja of Kolhapur
1924-1927: His Highness Kshatriya-Kulawatasana Sinhasanadhishwar, Shrimant Rajashri Sir Rajaram III Chhatrapati Maharaj Sahib Bahadur, Maharaja of Kolhapur, GCIE
1927-1931: Lieutenant-Colonel His Highness Kshatriya-Kulawatasana Sinhasanadhishwar, Shrimant Rajashri Sir Rajaram III Chhatrapati Maharaj Sahib Bahadur, Maharaja of Kolhapur, GCIE
1931-1937: Lieutenant-Colonel His Highness Kshatriya-Kulawatasana Sinhasanadhishwar, Shrimant Rajashri Sir Rajaram III Chhatrapati Maharaj Sahib Bahadur, Maharaja of Kolhapur, GCSI, GCIE
1937-1940: Colonel His Highness Kshatriya-Kulawatasana Sinhasanadhishwar, Shrimant Rajashri Sir Rajaram III Chhatrapati Maharaj Sahib Bahadur, Maharaja of Kolhapur, GCSI, GCIE
1940: Brigadier His Highness Kshatriya-Kulawatasana Sinhasanadhishwar, Shrimant Rajashri Sir Rajaram III Chhatrapati Maharaj Sahib Bahadur, Maharaja of Kolhapur, GCSI, GCIE

Honours
Knight Grand Commander of the Order of the Indian Empire (GCIE)-1924
Knight Grand Commander of the Order of the Star of India (GCSI)-1931
King George V Silver Jubilee Medal-1935
King George VI Coronation Medal-1937

References

External links

Knights Grand Commander of the Order of the Star of India
Knights Grand Commander of the Order of the Indian Empire
1897 births
1940 deaths
Maharajas of Kolhapur
Indian knights